Stephen James Kavanagh QPM DL    is the Executive Director for Police Services at the International Criminal Police Organisation (INTERPOL). He is the second highest-ranking official after the Secretary General. Prior to his role at INTERPOL, Kavanagh served as Chief Constable of Essex Police. He has served in various UK police forces since 1985.

INTERPOL 
In February 2020, Kavanagh was appointed Executive Director for Police Services at INTERPOL. He is in charge of the four Global Crime programmes: Cybercrime, Counter Terrorism, Organized and Emerging Crime, and Financial Crime & Anti-Corruption. 
In this role, Kavanagh has overseen large-scale operational initiatives and regional development programmes, including tackling child sexual abuse, cybercrime, wildlife crime, illicit drug operations and targeting most-wanted fugitives. Kavanagh’s operations have achieved a record number of drugs seizures, intercepted cybercrime operations worth 130 million USD and executed large-scale operations targeting terrorist suspects and transnational organised crime. 

As part of Kavanagh’s international responsibilities, he founded a new INTERPOL Liaison Office for the Caribbean and co-chairs the steering committee for INTERPOL-AFRIPOL relations.

UK Police Force Career
From 1985 to 2013, Kavanagh served in the Metropolitan Police. He worked in the Homicide Command and Anti-Corruption Command, and on the police response to the 7 July 2005 London bombings and the 21 July 2005 London bombings. Kavanagh has held a number of senior roles in the Metropolitan Police, including Commander Counter Terrorism, Deputy assistant commissioner for Territorial Policing, and Deputy Assistant Commissioner for Specialist Operations, where he worked on London’s Counter Terrorism strategy.

From 2010 to 2014, Kavanagh was the Open Source Intelligence Lead for the Association of Chief Police Officers and led the National Digital Intelligence and Investigations Portfolio, coordinating national and international digital crime co-operation.

From 2013 to 2018 Kavanagh was the Chief Constable of Essex Police. 

From 2015 to 2018, Kavanagh led the National Police Chief Council’s Digital Policing Portfolio, which included developing the National Committee for Digital Research and Industrial Co-operation. 

Kavanagh is currently serving as Assistant Commissioner of Police of the Metropolis in the Metropolitan Police on secondment to INTERPOL.

Education and Academic Career
In 2002 Kavanagh graduated from Wolfson College, Cambridge with a Masters in Philosophy and Criminology. From 2016 to 2018, Kavanagh was the Community Chair for Crime, Criminal Justice and Terrorism at the College of Policing. In 2018 Kavanagh became a Visiting Professor at the Institute for Analytics and Data Science at the University of Essex. In 2019, he was awarded an Honorary Doctorate of Law from Anglia Ruskin University. Kavanagh is currently a Leadership Fellow at St George's House (Windsor Castle).

Philanthropic Activities
Kavanagh is a Patron for JACKs (Joining Against Cancer in Kids)  and Open Road, an Essex-based drug and alcohol support service. Kavanagh is a Board member of the WeProtect Global Alliance against child sexual abuse and exploitation online. Kavanagh sits on the steering committee for the World Class Policing Awards.

Honours and Awards
 Queen's Police Medal (QPM) in 2018 for his distinguished service and contribution to policing in the UK. 
 Deputy Lieutenant for Essex, 2019
 Order of Police Merit by Spain, 2022.

Notes

Alumni of Wolfson College, Cambridge
British police officers
Living people
British Chief Constables
Deputy Lieutenants of Essex
Metropolitan Police chief officers
English recipients of the Queen's Police Medal
Chief Constables of Essex Police